Saint-Médard, commemorating Saint Medardus, may refer to:

France 
 Saint-Médard, Charente
 Saint-Médard, Charente-Maritime
 Saint-Médard, Haute-Garonne
 Saint-Médard, Gers
 Saint-Médard, Indre
 Saint-Médard, Lot
 Saint-Médard, Moselle
 Saint-Médard, Pyrénées-Atlantiques
 Saint-Médard, Deux-Sèvres
 Saint-Médard-d'Aunis
 Saint-Médard-de-Guizières
 Saint-Médard-de-Mussidan
 Saint-Médard-de-Presque
 Saint-Médard-d'Excideuil
 Saint-Médard-d'Eyrans
 Saint-Médard-en-Forez
 Saint-Médard-en-Jalles
 Saint-Médard-la-Rochette
 Saint-Médard-Nicourby
 Saint-Médard-sur-Ille
 Abbey of St. Medard, Soissons

Other countries 
 Saint-Médard, Herbeumont, Wallonia, Belgium
 Saint-Médard, Quebec, Canada
 Saint Medard, Ouest, Haiti